John Cockerill (born 12 July 1961) is an English former professional football player and manager.

He played as a midfielder from 1980 until 1992 notably for Grimsby Town. He also played for Lincoln City, Boston Town, Grantham Town, King's Lynn, Alfreton Town and Stafford Rangers. Cockerill went on to join the coaching staff at Grimsby Town and held various positions from 1992 until 2001. He was the club's caretaker manager on three occasions.

Playing career
After two abortive attempts at Lincoln City, Cockerill had a spell in the Royal Air Force and as a lorry driver, whilst continuing to play non-league football. In 1988, he was signed by Grimsby from Stafford Rangers for £21,500.

The highlight of his playing career with Grimsby, was the two goals he scored in 1991 against Exeter City in the last game of the season to secure promotion to Division Two. The end of his career came with a broken leg in 1991 against Bristol City; despite trying to regain full fitness, Cockerill never played another game.

Coaching career
Cockerill remained with Grimsby Town following his retirement and spent time at the club in various positions such as the Community Coach, Youth Coach and Reserve Team Manager. In 1994 he became caretaker manager following the resignation of Alan Buckley who had joined West Bromwich Albion. Cockerill again took over temporary first team responsibilities in 1996 when Brian Laws was dismissed but was overlooked in the job with the board instead re-hiring Buckley who in turn made Cockerill his assistant. He was part of the coaching staff of the 1997-98 team who reached two Wembley Stadium finals in a matter of weeks by triumphing in the Football League Trophy and the Second Division play-off final. He became caretaker manager for a third time again in September 2000 following Buckley's dismissal and would stay on as Lennie Lawrence's assistant before leaving the club a year later with Lawrence when he to was sacked.

Personal life
He is the son of Ron and brother of Glenn Cockerill, both also professional footballers.

Honours

Grimsby Town
Division Four runners up, Promoted: 1990
Division Three 3rd place, Promoted: 1991

References

External links
Grantham Town Player profile
Empics photo page

1961 births
Living people
People from Cleethorpes
Association football midfielders
English footballers
Lincoln City F.C. players
Boston Town F.C. players
Grantham Town F.C. players
King's Lynn F.C. players
Alfreton Town F.C. players
Stafford Rangers F.C. players
Grimsby Town F.C. players
English Football League players
English football managers
Grimsby Town F.C. managers
Grimsby Town F.C. non-playing staff